David H. Johnston (August 19, 1838 - September 12, 1931) was an American soldier and recipient of the Medal of Honor who received the medal for his actions in the American Civil War.

Biography 
Johnston was born in Indiana County, Pennsylvania on August 19, 1838, to David Johnston and Margaret Johnston. He served as a private in Company K of the 8th Missouri Volunteer Infantry during the American Civil War. He earned his medal in action at the Battle of Vicksburg, Mississippi on May 22, 1863. Johnston received his medal on August 16, 1884, but the U.S War Department mistakenly listed the recipient of the award as David A. Johnston from Missouri in their files. The mix up happened after A. Johnston's pension check was mistaken by the War Department for H. Johnston's pension check, who had not applied for a pension that year. Johnston only requested a pension in 1907.  The mistake was discovered in 1966 when a newspaper published a list of recipients and Johnston was absent. Johnston married Nancy Jane in 1872. The couple had eight children. Johnston died on September 12, 1931, in Central City Merrick County, Nebraska and is now buried in Pierce Chapel Bureau Cemetery, Clarks, Nebraska.

Legacy 
Johnson and other Nebraska associated Medal of Honor recipients were inducted into the Nebraska Hall of Fame in the 1970s and a Medal of Honor memorial gravestone was placed at Johnston's grave on Sunday, October 25, 1992, in a large family gathering to dedicate Johnston's life. His medal is also on display at the Merrick County Historical Society Museum.

Medal of Honor Citation 
For gallantry in the charge of the volunteer storming party on 22 May 1863, in action at Vicksburg, Mississippi.

External links 
 Photograph of Johnston and his gravestone as well as information on parents and children

References 

1838 births
1931 deaths